Paul Rogers is an American film editor. He is best known as the editor of the 2022 film Everything Everywhere All at Once, which earned him a number of accolades, including the Academy Award for Best Film Editing and the BAFTA Award for Best Editing.

He attended Homewood High School and graduated from the College at Santa Fe as a film student. He is married and thanked his wife (and his mother, photographer Melissa Springer ) during his Academy Awards speech. In a interview with Hollywood Reporter, Rogers advocated for a much greater work-life balance - especially one used by the Daniels.

Filmography

References

External links
 

Best Film Editing Academy Award winners
Best Editing BAFTA Award winners

Year of birth missing (living people)
Living people
American film editors